Power tower may refer to:

Power Tower, a thrill ride at Valleyfair and Cedar Point amusement parks in the USA
Power tower (power take-off), a type of mechanical power take-off (PTO)
Solar power tower, a type of solar power plant 
Tetration, a mathematical operation also known as power tower, hyperpower, or superexponentiation 
Transmission tower, usually a tall steel lattice tower supporting an overhead electric power line (aka electricity pylon, hydro tower, etc.)
Power tower (exercise), equipment can include pull up handles, dip bars, push up grips and captain's chair forearm pads
Power tower (Linz), an office building in Linz, Austria